General elections were held in Malawi on 19 May 2009. Incumbent President Bingu wa Mutharika ran for re-election; his main opponent was John Tembo, the president of the Malawi Congress Party (MCP). Five other candidates also ran.  The election was won by Mutharika, who was re-elected to the Presidency with around two-thirds of the vote. Mutharika's DPP also won a strong parliamentary majority.

Electoral system
Voter registration started in August 2008 and was scheduled to end on 29 November 2008, but on 20 November (by which time 3.5 million voters had been registered) it was announced that registration would be extended into December. This extension was caused by problems related to digital cameras that were necessary to the process.

Between 2 February and 6 February, presidential and parliamentary candidates submitted their nomination papers. The official campaigning period began on 17 March and is scheduled to conclude on 17 May. Parliament was dissolved on 20 March, in accordance with the constitution, and subsequently the Malawi Electoral Commission (MEC)will announce which candidates have been deemed eligible.

Campaign
On 22 October 2008, Hetherwick Ntaba, the Secretary-General of the Democratic Progressive Party (DPP), announced that the DPP national governing council had unanimously endorsed Mutharika as the party's presidential candidate a few days earlier. However, Foreign Minister Joyce Banda said on 16 January 2009 that Mutharika felt the endorsement of the council was inadequate and that he wanted the endorsement of the party's base. Therefore, he sought the backing of the delegates at a DPP convention. Later, as the DPP presidential candidate, Mutharika chose Banda as his vice-presidential candidate.

Bakili Muluzi, who was designated as the UDF's (United Democratic Front) presidential candidate, previously served two terms as president from 1994 to 2004. According to the constitution, a president is allowed to serve no more than two consecutive five-year terms. Because Muluzi had been out of office since 2004, his supporters argued that the term limit should not apply to him, as it did not restrict nonconsecutive terms if interpreted literally.

Speaking to Capital Radio on 22 February 2009, Muluzi accused the government of using intimidation against his candidacy and warned that such conduct could lead to "problems". A few days later, he was charged by the Anti-Corruption Bureau with stealing 12 million dollars of aid money; he appeared before a court in Blantyre and was released on bail. The Electoral Commission stated he was not eligible to run again, but his supporters are calling for an official court decision instead. On 16 May, only three days before the election, the Constitutional Court ruled that Muluzi could not run again.

MCP President John Tembo was considered the main opposition candidate, and the MCP formed an electoral alliance with the UDF prior to the election. Tembo's vice-presidential candidate was Brown Mpinganjira of the UDF. Observing that the DPP had never participated in an election (it was founded in 2005), Tembo argued that he and the MCP had the experience to govern the country properly: "I belong to the past, I belong to the present and I also belong to the future."

Independent candidate James Nyondo submitted his nomination papers on 4 February and claims to have sponsored over 120 independent parliamentary candidates by paying the MK 100,000 ($700 USD) nomination fee.  He is the only independent candidate in the 2009 presidential election and has campaigned on the need for a new generation of leadership, a smaller cabinet, and an end to the personal extravagance of the current and previous governments.

Loveness Gondwe of the New Rainbow Coalition submitted her presidential candidacy on 3 February, becoming the first woman to run for president in Malawi. She stressed the importance of holding a free and fair election and avoiding the kind of post-election turmoil that affected Kenya and Zimbabwe in 2008.

Observers expected a close election between the two strongest candidates, Mutharika and Tembo. While Tembo enjoyed the united backing of the country's two most established and powerful parties—the MCP and the UDF—he faced an incumbent president who had presided over strong economic growth of 8%, and the outcome was considered uncertain.

Mutharika, who was 75 years old at the time of the election, said that he would retire from politics if he lost the election and that he would retire in 2014 if he was successful in winning a second term.

Conduct
On the day of the election, Joy Radio, which is owned by UDF Chairman Bakili Muluzi, was closed by the police after it broadcast a satire that lampooned Mutharika. Two of the station's presenters and a technician were arrested. Tembo alleged that the government had committed electoral fraud with opposition poll agents being denied access to the vote counting centres. An EU observation team also noted that state television had failed to be neutral during the election campaigns, supporting the government.

Results
The Malawi Electoral Commission declared that Bingu wa Mutharika had won the presidential election on 21 May 2009, after 93% of votes had been counted. Mutharika gained 2.9 million votes with John Tembo, his nearest rival, winning 1.4 million.

In the National Assembly elections, the DPP won 114 seats (though the election of the vice president vacated one of those), obtaining a strong majority in the 193-seat National Assembly, while the MCP trailed distantly with 26 seats and the UDF won only 17. Mutharika and the DPP won an overwhelming victory in northern Malawi, but also performed well in the central and southern regions, although those regions have been historically dominated by the MCP and UDF respectively. Some analysts suggested that this election marked a departure from Malawi's traditional voting patterns, which are heavily influenced by region. Unlike Tembo, Muluzi accepted the official results of the election. 32 independent MPs were elected, though many of those started joining the DPP after the election; one seat was won by the Maravi People's Party (MPP), the Alliance for Democracy (Aford) and the Malawi Forum for Unity and Development (MAFUNDE). In one constituency, the election was postponed.

President

National Assembly

Elected MPs
A partial list of elected MPs from 156 constituencies:

Aftermath
Mutharika and Joyce Banda were respectively sworn in as president and vice-president on 22 May 2009. The MCP boycotted the event, but Muluzi was present. Some in the MCP called for the party to recognize Mutharika's victory and for Tembo to resign as MCP president. Tembo refused and vowed to legally challenge the results.

References

External links
International academic conference on the 2009 General Elections

Presidential elections in Malawi
Elections in Malawi
Malawi
General
Malawi